Oldeania alpina, the African alpine bamboo, is a perennial bamboo of the family Poaceae and the genus Yushania. It can be found growing in dense but not large stands  on the mountains and volcanoes surrounding the East African Rift between the altitudes of 2,500 meters (8,200 feet) and 3,300 meters (11,000 feet).

Description
Stems and leaves 200 – 1,950 centimeters (6 – 64 feet) tall and 5 – 12.5 centimeters (2 – 5 inches) in diameter; these grass stems get used as fencing, plumbing and other building materials. Culm sheaths (tubular coverings) are hairless or with red bristles.
Leaf sheath is covered with bristles. Leaf blades are "deciduous at the ligule"; blades  5 – 20 centimeters (2 – 8 inches) long.
Flowers Branched cluster of flowers in solitary spikes, which can be dense or loose and are 5–15 centimeters (2–6 inches) long.
Roots Short rhizomes described as pachymorph (a term which is recommended for describing rhizomes which are sympodial or superposed in such a way as to imitate a simple axis, but the word pachymorph would not be used for describing branches or in the case of bamboos, culms).

Distribution
Afrotropical realm: 
Northeast Tropical Africa: Ethiopia, Sudan
East Tropical Africa: Kenya, Tanzania, Uganda
West-Central Tropical Africa: Burundi, Cameroon, Congo, Rwanda, DR Congo
South Tropical Africa: Malawi, Zambia

References

Afromontane flora
Bambusoideae
Flora of Northeast Tropical Africa
Flora of East Tropical Africa
Flora of West-Central Tropical Africa
Flora of South Tropical Africa
Plants described in 1974